Pain Kesh Sara (also romanized as Pā’īn Kesh Sarā) is a village in Otaqvar Rural District, Otaqvar District, Langarud County, Gilan Province, Iran. At the 2006 census, its population was 30, in 6 families.

References 

Populated places in Langarud County